MullMuzzler 2 (also known as James LaBrie's MullMuzzler 2) is the second studio album by Dream Theater singer James LaBrie and his band MullMuzzler. It was released on September 11, 2001 through Magna Carta Records. This is the LaBrie's last album to be released using his band name, as his subsequent album was released under LaBrie's solo name.

Track listing

Personnel
James LaBrie – vocals, production
Trent Gardner – keyboard, spoken word
Matt Guillory – keyboard, piano, sampling
Mike Keneally – guitar
Michael Borkosky – additional guitar
Bryan Beller – bass
Mike Mangini – drums, percussion
Johnny Freeman – engineering
Tom Waltz – engineering
Victor Florencia – mixing
Jim Brick – mastering
Darko Boehringer – photography

References

MullMuzzler albums
2001 albums
Magna Carta Records albums
Albums with cover art by Dave McKean